Alappancode Easwara Kala Bhoothathan Temple is a very ancient and known centre of pilgrimage for the devotees of Alappancode Ammavan (Lord Ayyappa).

See also
 Sabarimala

References

Hindu temples in Kanyakumari district